The Hollywood Dell is a residential neighborhood located in the Hollywood Hills section of Los Angeles, California, in the lower eastern Santa Monica Mountains.  Before Highway 101 was constructed, this area was one with Whitley Heights and considered part of the original Hollywood Hills.  The generally accepted borders of "the Dell" are east of Cahuenga, north of Franklin, west of Argyle, and south of the Hollywood Reservoir.  It is fully encompassed by zip code 90068.

The Hollywood Dell is so named because it sits "in" the hills just above commercial and tourist-popular Hollywood, rather than atop the hills.  In general, one must travel downhill to enter the dell, and uphill to exit it.  The roads within the dell are mainly hilly, and many homes are built on hillside lots.

With its close proximity to the Hollywood Bowl, the Dell is a popular free parking area for concertgoers.  Concert parking is prohibited for such purposes, and a number of entries are guarded.  However, locals who know their way around can get into the neighborhood and contribute to a problematic overcrowded parking situation on concert nights.

Typical residences in the Hollywood Dell are single-family dwellings with a heavy influence of Spanish Colonial Revival Style architecture. There is also an active homeowners association, with voluntary dues,  named the Hollywood Dell Civic Association.

Demographics
The 2000 US Census reports the following general demographics for the 90068 zip code, where the Hollywood Dell is located:

Spouse – 2988
Child – 2454
Own Child Under 18 – 1875
Other Relatives – 705
Under 18 Yrs – 113
Nonrelatives – 3034
Unmarried Partner – 1089
With Own Children Under 18 Yrs – 1279
Married Family – 2988
Married With Own Children Under 18 Yrs – 954
Female Householder - No husband – 525
Female Householder with Own Children Under 18 Yrs – 229
Average Family Size – 2.61

Notable residents 
Robert J. Sexton, producer and director

Additional reading

 Leslie Anne Wiggins, "Life Here Is Music to Their Ears," Los Angeles Times, April 20, 2008, image 90

References

Neighborhoods in Los Angeles
Hollywood Hills
Populated places in the Santa Monica Mountains